Alexander Vincent Lennon (25 October 1925 – October 1992) was a Scottish professional footballer who played in the Football League for Mansfield Town and Queens Park Rangers.

References

1925 births
1992 deaths
Scottish footballers
Association football forwards
English Football League players
Rotherham United F.C. players
Mansfield Town F.C. players
Queens Park Rangers F.C. players